Badgen Station was a railway station on the Cleveland Line of Redland City, Queensland, Australia. It opened in 1916 on Badgen Road. It closed in 1960 with the closure of the railway beyond Lota and was demolished soon after. It was not rebuilt when the line was reopened in 1987.

References

Disused railway stations in Queensland